Segestria is a genus of lichenized fungi in the family Trichotheliaceae. It contains an estimated 70 species.

References

Gyalectales
Gyalectales genera
Lichen genera
Taxa described in 1825
Taxa named by Elias Magnus Fries